Pie Ntavyohanyuma is a Burundian politician who was head of the National Assembly from 2007 to 2015. He resigned and fled to Brussels, Belgium on June 28, 2015 during the 2015–2018 Burundian unrest, citing the unrest and his opposition to president Pierre Nkurunziza's bid for a disputed third term in the 2015 Burundian presidential election. He told France 24 that he "personally advised President Nkurunziza to drop his plan for a third term, but his answer was to threaten me, to humiliate me."

References

Members of the National Assembly (Burundi)
Presidents of the National Assembly (Burundi)
Burundian expatriates in Belgium
Year of birth missing (living people)
Living people
Place of birth missing (living people)